Walley is a surname and given name. It may refer to:

Surname
 Augustus Walley (1856–1938), a Buffalo Soldier in the United States Army and recipient of the Medal of Honor
 Byron Walley, a pen name of writer Orson Scott Card (born 1951)
 Chris Walley (born 1954), Welsh geologist
 Chris Walley (actor) (born 1995), Irish actor
 Deborah Walley (1943–2001), American actress
 Denny Walley (born 1943), American guitarist
 Ernie Walley (born 1933), Welsh football player, manager and coach
 Hugh Walley, footballer
 Joan Walley, (born 1949), British politician
 John Walley (died 1615), English Member of Parliament
 Keith Walley (born 1954), English footballer
 Nigel Walley (born 1941), English rock bass guitarist with The Quarrymen
 Richard Walley (born 1953), Australian Aborigine performer, musician, writer and activist
 Samuel H. Walley (1805-1877), American politician
 Tom Walley (born 1945), Welsh footballer

Given name
 Walley Barnes (1920–1975), Welsh footballer and broadcaster
 Walley Chamberlain Oulton (c. 1770–c. 1820?), Irish playwright, theatre historian and man of letters

See also
 Moira Walley-Beckett, Canadian actress
 Wally (disambiguation)
 Whalley (disambiguation)

Masculine given names